Preet Sanghreri is an Indian artist, lyricist and singer associated with Punjabi music. His real name is 'Chamkaur Singh Ghuman' 
 
 
He is known for his songs with notable Punjabi Singers - Manmohan Waris, Kamal Heer, Nachhatar Gill, Roshan Prince, Deep Dhillon, Mannat Noor, Miss Pooja, Lakhwinder Wadali & Ravinder Grewal. He rose to fame with Ravinder Grewal's Blockbuster Song - Lovely V/s PU.

Career 
He started his career as a writer, He has written the following books.

Discography as a Lyricist

As a Lyricist, he has given 60+ songs to Punjabi music industry till date.

Discography as a Lyricist in Films

Singing career
He debuted as a singer with Pakki Sarpanchi.

Education 
Preet Sanghreri holds the following degrees. Currently, he is pursuing Ph.D. in Punjabi from Punjabi University, Patiala.

References 

Living people
Punjabi people
Punjabi-language lyricists
1983 births